Bharan is a village in the district of Rohtak in the Indian state of Haryana.

References 

Villages in Rohtak district